Pippidi is a Romanian surname. Notable people with the surname include:

Alina Mungiu-Pippidi (born 1964), Romanian political scientist, academic, journalist, and writer
Andrei Pippidi (born 1948), Romanian historian

Romanian-language surnames
Surnames of Romanian origin